Elections to Barrow-in-Furness Borough Council were held on 3 May 2007. One third of the council was up for election and the council stayed under no overall control.

After the election, the composition of the council was
Conservative 19
Labour 16
Independent 2
People's Party 1

Election result

Ward results

References
2007 Barrow-in-Furness election result
Ward results

2007 English local elections
2007
2000s in Cumbria